Belvidere Mills is an unincorporated community in Belvidere Township, Goodhue County, Minnesota, United States.

The community is located near the junction of County 2 Boulevard and County 3 Boulevard.

State Highway 58 (MN 58) and County Road 9 are also nearby. Wells Creek and Clear Creek both flow through the community.

Nearby places include Goodhue, Red Wing, Frontenac, Bellechester, and Lake City.

Belvidere Mills is located in sections 4 and 5 of Belvidere Township.

ZIP codes 55027 (Goodhue) and 55066 (Red Wing) meet near Belvidere Mills. The community had a post office from 1877 to 1905.

References

Unincorporated communities in Minnesota
Unincorporated communities in Goodhue County, Minnesota